Sir Robert Lang Lickley  (19 January 1912 – 7 July 1998) was a Scottish aeronautical engineer, and Chief Engineer at Fairey Aviation during whose tenure the Fairey Delta 2 became the first aircraft to exceed 1,000 mph.

Early life
Lickley was born in Dundee in Scotland and was educated at the High School of Dundee. He studied Civil Engineering at the University of Edinburgh where he graduated BSc, and then went on to Imperial College London as a postgraduate, where he studied Aeronautics on a Caird Scholarship.

Career

Hawker

Lickley joined the stress office of Hawker at Kingston upon Thames in 1933. He worked on a new single-seat eight-gun monoplane for specification F5/34. This became the Hawker Hurricane, which first flew in 1935.

As a Chief Project Engineer he worked on the Typhoon, Tempest, and Sea Fury. He worked on Hawker's entry into jet flight, the P.1040, which became the Sea Hawk.

Cranfield
He became Professor of Aircraft Design in 1946 at the new College of Aeronautics at Cranfield, which became Cranfield University.

Fairey

In November 1951 Lickley became Technical Director and Chief Engineer of Fairey Aviation, initially working on the Fairey Gannet, including the AEW version. He put together a team of aerodynamicists and mathematicians at their headquarters at Hayes in Middlesex. Fairey was also based in northern Cheshire.

At the same time the Fairey Rotodyne compound gyroplane was being developed, although ultimately cancelled in 1962. The military version would have cost too much and BEA considered the commercial prospects to be not sufficiently assured. The 48-seat aircraft had been planned for the London-Paris route. Fairey also developed the Fairey Ultra-light Helicopter for the Royal Navy, but it was not adopted. The company developed the Fireflash, the UK's first air-to-air missile, at its site at Heston. The total engineering team and staff at Hayes was around 1,000. Lickley later became Managing Director. Part of the company also helped to build the Trawsfynydd nuclear power station.

The British Conservative government cancelled Fairey's new fighter, based on the FD2. A Fairey Delta 3 had also been planned. The French, however, saw the development potential for the FD2 concept, and their Dassault Mirage aircraft would be produced in many variants and exported to many countries. The FD2 had a drooped nose (10 degrees) which included the cockpit. A simpler droop nose, in so far as it was only the unpressurized part in front of the cockpit, was later developed for Concorde.

Institutions
In the 1950s Lickley was a member of the Aeronautical Research Council and Society of British Aerospace Companies. He received an Honorary Doctorate of Science from the University of Edinburgh in 1973 and from the University of Strathclyde in January 1987. He worked with the Science and Engineering Research Council (SERC).

In 1977 he was elected a Fellow of the Royal Society of Edinburgh. His proposers were Donald McCallum, Sir John Atwell, Francis Penny and Thomas Diery Patten.

On 25 November 1981, speaking as President of the Institution of Production Engineers, he said the Government appears to have developed a smooth transfer line which moves the oil revenues to the unemployed without any intervening checks or delays. Instead the checks and delays exist, it would seem, to restrain industry from becoming more efficient and to reduce the likelihood of more young people moving into engineering. At the time his words were echoed by Robert Inskip, 2nd Viscount Caldecote.

Personal life
Lickley married Doris May (d.1997) and they had a son and a daughter. They lived in Walton-on-Thames. He was created a Commander of the Order of the British Empire (CBE) in 1973 and knighted in the 1984 Queen's birthday honours.

References

External links
 Obituary from the Royal Society of Edinburgh
 IMechE Heritage
 Fairey Delta 2

Video clips
 
 

1912 births
1998 deaths
Academics of Cranfield University
Alumni of Imperial College London
Alumni of the University of Edinburgh
Commanders of the Order of the British Empire
Fairey Aviation Company
Fellows of the Institution of Engineering and Technology
Fellows of the Institution of Mechanical Engineers
Fellows of the Royal Academy of Engineering
Fellows of the Royal Aeronautical Society
Fellows of the Royal Society of Edinburgh
Hawker Siddeley
Knights Bachelor
People educated at the High School of Dundee
Engineers from Dundee
People from Walton-on-Thames
Royal Aeronautical Society Gold Medal winners
Scottish aerospace engineers